Maria Lamor is a Spanish actress, known for roles in Star knight(1985), Orquesta Club Virginia (1992) and the TV series Brigada central (1989).

References

External links

Living people
Spanish voice actresses
Spanish stage actresses
Year of birth missing (living people)